Wella AG is a company specializing in hair care, styling, colorants, and other beauty products, and was founded in 1880 in Germany by Franz Ströher. Its headquarters are currently in Geneva, Switzerland. The company was controlled by Procter & Gamble from 2003 until it was sold to Coty Inc. in 2015 along with some 40 other P&G brands. On December 1, 2020, Coty completed the sale of the Wella, Clairol, OPI and ghd brands stake to American private equity firm KKR for $2.5bn in cash whilst retaining 40% stake in the standalone company.

On October 1, 2021, Coty announced that it would sell an approximate 9% stake to KKR for $426.5 million. The deal reduces Coty's stake in the Wella, Clairol, OPI and ghd brands to around 30.6%.

On November 8, 2021, Coty agreed to sell an approximate 4.7% stake in Wella to KKR in exchange for the redemption of approximately 56% of KKR's remaining convertible preferred shares in Coty. The deal reduces Coty's stake in Wella, Clairol, OPI and ghd to approximately 25.9%. KKR will continue to have a 2.4% ownership stake in Coty on an as-converted basis.

History

Origins 
Wella was founded in 1880 by Franz Ströher, a hairdresser from Saxony, Eastern Germany. The company originally made tulles, the base used for making wigs. In 1890, he invented the Tullemoid Waterproof, a technique that allowed the scalp to breathe. In 1894, he opened his first factory in Rothenkirchen, Germany and his sons Karl and George Ströher joined the business soon after.
 
In 1924, the Ströhers registered the name Wella at the German patent office. As wigs and hairpieces fell out of fashion, the company turned to permanent wave products; the name Wella was taken from Dauerwellapparat, meaning "permanent wave device" in German. In 1927, they introduced the first perming appliance and supplied it to salons. In the 1930s Wella developed the first hair dryers with built-in motors and movable tubes that allowed head movement during the drying process. Also in the 1930s, Wella introduced Wella Junior, a portable perming machine.

Nazi Germany and Cold War era 
The company suffered under the National Socialist regime due to the Nazi's economic policy and their restrictions on raw-material supplies, along with wartime conditions. As Freemasons, the Ströher brothers were actively opposed to National Socialism. During the Second World War, the Welle plant in Apolda was used to manufacture ventilation systems and equipment for submarines, no longer producing their permanent wave machines and hair dryers.

After World War II, the German Democratic Republic dismantled the Wella plant in Apolda as part of the reparations plan enacted by the Soviet Union. The plant in Rothenkirchen was expropriated and renamed VEB Londa, becoming communal state property under the Volkseigener Betrieb. The Ströher family and some members of staff decided to start the business again from scratch on a smaller scale in Hünfeld, Osthessen under the name Ondal GmbH. Production began again in 1946 with the new business being registered as Wella AG in 1950 with the central management of the company located in Darmstadt, Hessen in West Germany. Throughout the 50s and 60s the company followed an aggressive campaign in international markets within developing countries such as Chile, Brazil, the Asian and Pacific territories as well as various parts of Africa. After the reunification of Germany, in February 1990 the Rothenkirchen plant was reintegrated into Wella, forming a joint venture with Londa to produce and market hairdressing products throughout Europe.
 
In 1950, Wella introduced Koleston, the first hair balm designed to protect and nourish hair. In 1954, Hollywood icon Elizabeth Taylor appeared in Koleston advertising.
 
In the 1960s, the company launched Wella Privat, a salon-exclusive product range that let customers take professional-style products home for the first time. In the early 1970s, Wella introduced Perform a new perm product that allowed hairdressers to create Afro style looks. In 1972 they released Wella Balsam, the first shampoo specifically produced for retail sales. The advertising campaign featured the stars of TV show Charlie's Angels: Farrah Fawcett, Jaclyn Smith and Cheryl Ladd. Wella also launched For Men, their first ever product line exclusively for men.

Modern History 
In 1995, Wella re-launched the Koleston line as Koleston Perfect. The new product included natural ingredients including fruit wax. 2002 saw the launch of Wella TrendVision, an annual presentation of Wella's haute couture hair collections. The event is now known as the International TrendVision Award, or ITVA: a global hairdressing competition.

In 2003, Wella was acquired by Procter & Gamble (P&G), purchasing 77.6% of the company for $3.4 billion and paying a total of $5.7 billion including shares, further expanding the group's beauty portfolio across Eastern and Western Europe, and Latin America.
 
Josh Wood became a Global Wella Professionals Colour Ambassador in January 2008 and in 2010 took on the full-time role as Wella Professionals’ Global Creative Director of Colour. Eugene Souleiman currently serves as Global Creative Director for Wella Professionals.

Wella founded Making Waves in 2011 – a programme that teaches hairdressing and life skills to disadvantaged young people. The program started in Brazil and has since expanded to include Romania, Cambodia, and Vietnam and has trained over 44,800 people.

In 2014, Wella patented a new molecule called ME+. This molecule is a substitute for PPD, also known as p-phenylenediamine, and PTD or para-toluenediamine which are present in most colouring products to fix the colour. PPD and PTD been known to cause mild to severe allergic reactions. The ME+ molecule is used in the Wella Professionals colour brand Koleston Perfect Innosense, which was the first permanent colour product to be approved by the European Centre for Allergy Research Foundation (ECARF). As of 2019 the ME+ molecule is now used in the complete Wella Professionals Koleston Perfect line.

In 2015, Coty Inc. announced that they would be buying 43 beauty brands from P&G for 12.5 Billion and finished the merger in October 2016. Bart Becht, former Coty Chairman and Chief Executive, stated that the company would take over all of P&G's Wella management teams.

In 2020, the investment firm Kohlberg Kravis Roberts (KKR) announced a 60% acquisition of Wella from Coty, appointing Annie Young-Scrivner, the previous CEO of Godiva Chocolatier, as the new CEO of the company. KKR, valuing Coty's Professional and Retail hair business, included are Wella, Clairol, OPI, and the ghd brands (placed together under the "Wella" moniker), at $4.3 billion, will be investing $1 billion directly as deleveragement alongside $2.5 billion in net cash proceeds when the Wella deal is closed, expected to be within the next six to nine months. The Wella business will issue around $1 billion of debt after the closing of the deal, distributing the proceeds to its shareholders.

The deal closed on December 1, 2020, establishing the Wella Company as a stand-alone private entity based in Geneva, Switzerland.

in April 2022, Wella announced it had acquired the eco-haircare brand, Briogeo from Nancy Twine.

Awards

References

External links 
 

Cosmetics companies of Germany
Former Procter & Gamble brands
Companies based in Hesse
Chemical companies established in 1880
1880 establishments in Germany
2003 mergers and acquisitions
2015 mergers and acquisitions
Darmstadt
Hair care products
Coty Inc.
German subsidiaries of foreign companies